The Man with the Punch is a 1920 American short silent Western film directed by Edward Laemmle and featuring Hoot Gibson.

Cast
 Hoot Gibson as the stranger (credited as Ed Hoot Gibson)
 Jim Corey as Sheriff Jeff Sellers
 Charles Newton as Frank Lane
 Dorothy Wood as Mary Lane
 Ben Corbett as Snake Harris (uncredited)

See also
 Hoot Gibson filmography

External links
 

1920 films
1920 Western (genre) films
1920 short films
American silent short films
American black-and-white films
Films directed by Edward Laemmle
Silent American Western (genre) films
1920s American films